West Bend is an unincorporated community in Saskatchewan.

Foam Lake No. 276, Saskatchewan
Former villages in Saskatchewan
Unincorporated communities in Saskatchewan
Division No. 10, Saskatchewan